The Norway national baseball team is the national baseball team of Norway. The team competes in the bi-annual European Baseball Championship.

Roster
Norway's roster for the European Baseball Championship Qualifier 2022, the last official competition in which the team took part.

References

National baseball teams in Europe
Baseball in Norway
Baseball